Theodore Lee Hullar (born March 19, 1935) was Chancellor of the University of California, Riverside from 1985 to 1987 and Chancellor of the University of California, Davis from 1987 to 1994.  A biochemist by training, he was one developer of the Hanessian–Hullar reaction.

References

External links
 reference regarding UCR dates

1935 births
Living people
Chancellors of the University of California, Riverside
Chancellors of the University of California, Davis